Robert P. "Bob" Dettmer (born March 1, 1951) is a Minnesota politician and member of the Minnesota House of Representatives. A member of the Republican Party of Minnesota, he represents District 39A, located in the northeastern part of the Twin Cities metro area, which includes Chisago and Washington counties.

Early life, education, and career
Dettmer attended Bemidji State University and graduated with a Bachelor of Science degree in Health and Physical Education in 1973. He also holds of Masters Of Education degree from St. Thomas University. He subsequently became a teacher in Forest Lake at Forest Lake High School, where he taught physical education and coached wrestling until 2007.

Dettmer served in the United States Army Reserve retiring as a Chief Warrant Officer 4 (CW4) in the Military Intelligence branch. In November 2001, he began a two-year tour on active duty supporting Operation Enduring Freedom at Fort Gordon, Georgia, and later Operation Iraqi Freedom. Two of his sons also serve as officers in the U.S. Army.

Minnesota House of Representatives

Dettmer was elected in 2006 to the open seat vacated by Representative Ray Vandeveer, who ran for higher office that year. He was re-elected in 2008, 2010, 2012, 2014, 2016, and 2018. He focuses on the issues of education, health care reform, economic growth, transportation, veterans and military affairs, and public safety.

Local elections

2018

2016

2014

2012

2010

2008

2006

See also
 2006 Minnesota House of Representatives elections
 2008 Minnesota House of Representatives elections
 2010 Minnesota House of Representatives elections
 2012 Minnesota House of Representatives elections
 2014 Minnesota House of Representatives elections

References

External links

 Rep. Bob Dettmer Web Page
 Rep. Dettmer Campaign Web Site.

Living people
1951 births
People from Forest Lake, Minnesota
Republican Party members of the Minnesota House of Representatives
United States Army officers
Bemidji State University alumni
United States Army personnel of the Iraq War
21st-century American politicians
People from Faribault, Minnesota
Schoolteachers from Minnesota